The Examinations Council of Zambia (ECZ) was established under the Examinations Council of Zambia Act of 1983, to set and conduct examinations and award certificates to successful candidates.

Qualifications

Junior Certificate Examination (JCE)

Grading 
Junior certificate of education for 2022

See also 
 General Certificate of Education (GCE)
 GCE Ordinary Level

References

External links 
 

1987 establishments in Zambia
Organizations established in 1987
Educational organisations based in Zambia
Secondary school qualifications
School qualifications